José Alves da Costa  (April 20, 1939 – December 4, 2012) was a Brazilian prelate of the Catholic Church who was the bishop of the Diocese of Corumbá in Brazil.

Ordained to the priesthood in 1965, he was named bishop in 1986 and resigned in 1999.

Notes

20th-century Roman Catholic bishops in Brazil
1939 births
2012 deaths
Roman Catholic bishops of Corumbá
Roman Catholic bishops of Ponta Grossa